Tijana Krivaćević (born 8 April 1990) is a Serbian-born Hungarian professional female basketball player. She plays as center / forward. She is the daughter of the former Serbian basketball player Dragoljub Krivaćević, who works as a coach in Hungary. Just on her 20th birthday, Tijana was picked by Seattle Storm on the 2010 WNBA Draft in the third round, 34th overall.

Tijana participated in University games the first time in 2013 in the city of Kazan structure of the national team of Hungary where took the 7th place. She played there six matches and She gathered 129 points. The best indicator of team. The best match is considered against the Czech Republic - 34 points for a match! It enters in Top-10 of the best snipers.

See also 
 List of Serbian WNBA players

References
Tijana Krivacevic profile @ MKB Sopron official website
Info, stats, bio @ fibaeurope.com

1990 births
Living people
Hungarian expatriate basketball people in Israel
Hungarian people of Serbian descent
Hungarian women's basketball players
Naturalized citizens of Hungary
Power forwards (basketball)
Seattle Storm draft picks
Serbian expatriate basketball people in Hungary
Serbian expatriate basketball people in Slovakia
Serbian expatriate basketball people in Spain
Serbian expatriate basketball people in Turkey
Serbian women's basketball players
Basketball players from Novi Sad
Hungarian expatriate basketball people in Spain
Hungarian expatriate basketball people in Slovakia
Hungarian expatriate basketball people in Turkey
Serbian expatriate basketball people in Israel
Hungarian expatriate basketball people in Italy
Serbian expatriate basketball people in Italy